Muthuvalloor is a village in Gudipala mandal in Chittoor district in the state of Andhra Pradesh, India.

Villages in Chittoor district